Atik Ismail (born 5 January 1957) is a Finnish former footballer. He played 26 matches in the Finland national football team scoring 7 goals. Ismail was the top scorer of Finnish premier division Mestaruussarja in 1978, 1979 and 1982. In 1978, he was nominated as the Finnish Footballer of the Year. Ismail also played abroad, for example in Turkey and Belgium.

Personal life 
Atik Ismail was born to a Tatar family in Munkkiniemi, Helsinki. He and his twin brother Atik Ismail were named after Turkish wrestlers Celal Atik and Adil Atan. His brother is also a former footballer.

Children of Ismail are Can Heikkonen (b. 1982), twins Pele and Ali Koljonen (s. 1988) and Maria Koljonen (s. 1989). Sons Ali and Pele have also played football.

For decades Ismail suffered from alcoholism. He sobered completely in 1990 and has since worked with helping fellow recovering addicts. According to Ismail, his alcohol addiction switched to a gambling problem and he’s had difficulty paying his debts from his small pension.

In addition to sports, Ismail has published his poetry, worked as a nurse and been involved in politics. He was a candidate to the European Parliament in the elections of 1999 (Green League) and 2009 (Left Alliance).

The Finnish press remembers Atik Ismail as a ”legendary footballer”, but also as someone who partly wasted his potential due to his alcoholism.

References

External links 
 Atik Ismail Interview
 We asked, the former Finnish football player Atik Ismail answered

1957 births
Finnish footballers
Finnish expatriate footballers
Finland international footballers
Helsingin Jalkapalloklubi players
Finnish expatriate sportspeople in Turkey
Finnish expatriate sportspeople in Belgium
Finnish expatriate sportspeople in Sweden
AIK Fotboll players
Beşiktaş J.K. footballers
K.S.V. Waregem players
Finnish people of Tatar descent
Living people
Finnish Muslims
Palloiluseura Apollo players
FC Kiffen 08 players
Association football forwards
Mestaruussarja players
Footballers from Helsinki